Banática is a small town at Almada, Portugal. Its name may derive from the Arabic language word for prince. It is the first port at the Tejo. It has a Repsol oil refinery,  a sports club, Clube Recreativo e Desportivo de Banática,  and a coast control unit of the Portuguese Republican National Guard.

References

Almada
Caparica (Almada)
Populated places in Setúbal District
Towns in Portugal